Sanguinograptis prosphora is a species of moth of the family Tortricidae. It is found in Nigeria.

The wingspan is about 10 mm. The forewings are leaden grey with three red lines from the dorsum. The costa, apex and almost the entire termen are orange cream. The hindwings are greyish.

Etymology
The species name refers to the similarity to Sanguinograptis ochrolegnia and is derived from Greek prosphoros (meaning similar).

References

Moths described in 2012
Tortricini